Sáchica is a municipality of Colombia situated approximately  west of Tunja in the Ricaurte Province of the department of Boyacá. Sáchica borders Sutamarchán and Villa de Leyva in the north, in the east Chíquiza, Samacá and Ráquira in the south and in the west Ráquira and Sutamarchán. Sáchica is known as the national capital of onions.

History 
In the centuries before the arrival of the Spanish conquistadores, Sáchica was ruled by a cacique loyal to the zaque of Hunza. Evidence of long inhabitation has been found in the form of petroglyphs made by the Muisca who were organized in the Muisca Confederation. The Muisca had their own religion where their main gods were Sué (the Sun) and Chía; the Moon. In Sáchica monuments to both celestial bodies have been constructed.

Modern Sáchica was founded on July 16, 1556, by Juan Velasco and Carlos Rojas. In 1574 a total of 2500 indigenous people were living in Sáchica, presently only 5% is indigenous, the remainder mestizo.

In the Chibcha language of the Muisca, Sáchica means "our present domain", "fortress" or "mansion of the sovereign".

Rock art 

In a rock shelter in Sáchica, rock art in the form of pictographs has been discovered. The archaeologist Eliécer Silva Celis pioneered in the study of them in the 1960s. Later research has been performed by Carl Henrik Langebaek, Diego Martínez, Álvaro Botiva, Pedro Argüello García, and others. The rock art has been produced in rock shelters of Lower Cretaceous formations.

Economy 
Sachiquense economy is based on religious tourism, agriculture; onions and tomatoes, and mining; gypsum, marble and clay.

Trivia 
 The ichthyosaur Platypterygius sachicarum(Now Kyhytysuka sachicarum), found in the Paja Formation of Villa de Leyva, has been named after Sáchica

Gallery

References

Bibliography 
 

Municipalities of Boyacá Department
Populated places established in 1556
1556 establishments in the Spanish Empire
Muisca Confederation
Muysccubun
Muisca and pre-Muisca sites
Rock art in South America